Ahi Dasht (also Romanized as Āhī Dasht; also known as Āhū Dasht) is a village in Kolijan Rostaq-e Sofla Rural District, in the Central District of Sari County, Mazandaran Province, Iran. At the 2006 census, its population was 2,827, in 696 families.

References 

Populated places in Sari County